Shareh (also Romanized as Shāreh and Shārah) is a village in Karrab Rural District, in the Central District of Sabzevar County, Razavi Khorasan Province, Iran. At the 2006 census, its population was 216, in 81 families.

References 

Populated places in Sabzevar County